State Route 47 (SR 47) is a Tennessee State Highway located entirely within Dickson County.

SR 47 is generally traversed only in part; the two termini are in fact only about eight miles (13 km) distant from each other, and are impracticable as a route from end-to-end, as the distance the highway runs is over twice this long.

Route description
State Route 47 begins as a secondary highway at an intersection with State Route 48 slightly southeast of downtown Dickson near the Fairgrounds.  In the Dickson city limits, it is known as East Walnut Street.  Outside of Dickson, the road runs east through the communities of Colesburg and Burns.  From Burns it runs east past the southern entrance to Montgomery Bell State Park in the Bakersworks community and then onto an intersection with U.S. Route 70 in western White Bluff.

At this point the highway is overlain by US 70 for approximately one mile (1.6 km); it then turns north as a primary highway to Charlotte, where it terminates just south of the downtown area with another intersection with State Route 48.

History

The portion between White Bluff and Dickson represents the original routing of State Route 1/US 70 through the area; when the current US 70 was constructed (1939–1941) this road was redesignated as part of State Route 47.

Major intersections

References

047